The Man Who Couldn't Say No is a 1938 German romantic comedy film directed by Mario Camerini and starring Karl Ludwig Diehl, Karin Hardt, and Leo Slezak. It is a remake of the 1936 Italian film But It's Nothing Serious also directed by Camerini. It was shot at the Halensee Studios in Berlin. The film's sets were designed by the art directors Gabriel Pellon and Heinrich Richter.

Plot 
German version of the Italian film Ma Non È Una Cosa Seria, from a Pirandello story: a man inoculates himself against emotional entanglement by deliberately marrying a woman he has no interest in and with whom he will spend no time.

Cast

References

Bibliography 
 
 Klaus, Ulrich J. Deutsche Tonfilme: Jahrgang 1938. Klaus-Archiv, 1988.

External links 
 

1938 romantic comedy films
1938 films
Films directed by Mario Camerini
Films of Nazi Germany
Remakes of Italian films
German romantic comedy films
1930s German-language films
Films based on works by Luigi Pirandello
1930s German films
Films shot at Halensee Studios